The Nairobi Southern Bypass Highway is a road in Kenya, forming a semi-circle through the south-western neighborhoods of the capital city of Nairobi. The road allows traffic from Mombasa, destined for western Kenya and Uganda to bypass downtown Nairobi, thereby reducing traffic congestion in the city's central business district.

Location
The road then loops through the south-western suburbs of Nairobi, including the northern environs of Nairobi National Park, Uhuru Gardens, Lang'ata and Dagoretti. In Dagoretti, the road enters Kiambu County and then turns northwards, to pass through Muguga and end in the town of Kikuyu, in a suburb known as Gitaru. At that location, the road connects with the Nairobi-Malaba Road (A104).

Overview
This road is intended to relieve traffic congestion in the capital city's central business district, by diverting long-distance traffic from and to the port city to Mombasa, destined for western Kenya and the land-locked countries of Uganda, Rwanda, Burundi, South Sudan and the eastern parts of the Democratic Republic of the Congo.

In a similar effort, other bypass highways have been built on the northern and eastern sides of Nairobi, with the objective of alleviating downtown traffic congestion.

Construction
The Kenya National Highway Authority (KeNHA), selected China Road and Bridge Corporation to construct the four-lane dual carriageway highway, at a cost of US$180 million (KSh18 billion). The construction was funded by the government of Kenya together with the Export Import Bank of China, as illustrated in the table below. The completed road was commissioned by the president of Kenya, Uhuru Kenyatta and his guest, the president of Tanzania, John Magufuli, on 2 November 2016.

See also
 East African Community
 List of roads in Kenya
 Nairobi Bypasses

References

External links
 Why you will soon be paying on the spot to use major roads As of 16 June 2018.

Roads in Kenya
Nairobi
Kiambu County
Transport infrastructure completed in 2016
2016 establishments in Kenya